Alistair Charles McGowan (born 24 November 1964) is an English impressionist, comic, actor, singer and writer best known to British audiences for The Big Impression (formerly Alistair McGowan's Big Impression), which was, for four years, one of BBC1's top-rating comedy programmes – winning numerous awards, including a BAFTA in 2003. He has also worked extensively in theatre and appeared in the West End in Art, Cabaret, The Mikado and Little Shop of Horrors (for which he received a Laurence Olivier Award nomination). As a television actor, he played the lead role in BBC1's Mayo. He wrote the play Timing (nominated as Best New Comedy at the whatsonstage.com awards) and the book A Matter of Life and Death or How to Wean Your Man off Football with former comedy partner Ronni Ancona. He also provided voices for Spitting Image.

He made his debut broadcast as a tennis commentator for BBC Sport at the 2011 Wimbledon Championships.

In 2012, McGowan wrote and hosted the ITV comedy sports show You Cannot Be Serious!, in which his impressions included Roy Hodgson, Jedward and Louie Spence.

He has written and starred in three plays for BBC Radio 4 about Erik Satie: Three Pieces in the Shape of a Pear), John Field (The Peregrinations of a Most Musical Irishman) and George Bernard Shaw (The 'B' Word). He devised stage shows showcasing the music and verse of Noël Coward (Sincerely Noel), and the music and writings of Erik Satie (Erik Satie's-faction). He wrote the stage play Timing (nominated as Best New Comedy at the 2009 whatsonstage.com awards.

Career
McGowan found work as a comedian, and performed some of the voices for the ITV television series Spitting Image. His sporting impressions were showcased on the BBC 2 football magazine programme Sick as a Parrot. He also appeared as the recycling man in the BBC show Think about Science.

Later he took over from Stephen Tompkinson playing Spock in the Tim Firth comedy drama, Preston Front. In his early career, McGowan had minor roles in shows such as Children's Ward, and in the pilot episode of Jonathan Creek. He also was a series regular in the first season of Dead Ringers.

McGowan also appeared in the Scottish football sketch show Only an Excuse? from 1996 to 1998. He also hosted and starred in a sporting impressions show on Radio 5 live called The Game's Up in the late 1990s.

In 1998, McGowan provided all of the voice characterisation in the 1998 revival of James the Cat for Channel 5 and later in the 2000s, McGowan went onto provide guest voices for Yoko! Jakamoko! Toto! and Planet Sketch both for CITV (Yoko! Jakamoko! Toto! later went onto air on both the BBC and CBeebies in 2008).

From 2 June to 7 July 2012, McGowan has hosted and written the ITV comedy series, You Cannot Be Serious! Impressions include England manager Roy Hodgson, Eurovision duo Jedward, and TV personality Louie Spence.

McGowan is patron of the Ludlow Fringe Festival, where he first performed live in 2013. At the town's St Laurence's Church during the 2021 festival, he performed The Piano Show combining classical pieces played on a Steinway Grand Piano with stand-up comedy and impressions.

The Big Impression
McGowan is best known for the TV show The Big Impression, formerly Alistair McGowan's Big Impression, with Ronni Ancona. His celebrity impressions include David Beckham, Sven-Göran Eriksson, Gary Lineker, Nicky Campbell, Richard Madeley, Tony Blair, Prince Charles, Robert Kilroy-Silk, Laurence Llewelyn-Bowen, Angus Deayton, Terry Wogan and the fictional characters Ross Geller (from Friends) and Dot Cotton (from EastEnders).
McGowan and Ancona are probably best known for their portrayal of Posh and Becks, with McGowan as David Beckham and Ancona in the role of Victoria Beckham.

Return to acting and radio work (2005)
He made a return to dramatic acting in 2005, appearing in the BBC's adaptation of Charles Dickens's novel Bleak House. He also appeared at the Chichester Festival Theatre in two plays; the first was a new translation of Nikolai Gogol's The Government Inspector by Alistair Beaton, the second was a new play called 5/11, which was produced to mark the 400-year anniversary of the Gunpowder Plot. In 2006, he starred in the detective series Mayo. He also presented an episode of Have I Got News for You on 20 October 2006. He joined the Royal Shakespeare Company for the Christmas 2006 season playing Mr Page in Merry Wives: the Musical (a version of The Merry Wives of Windsor) opposite Judi Dench, Simon Callow and Haydn Gwynne.

Despite his acting commitments, he continued to appear on BBC Radio and television as an announcer and as an impersonator. He has re-voiced video footage of BBC Sports Personality of the Year and Match of the Day.

In 2007, McGowan starred as Orin Scrivello (and other, smaller characters) in the West End transfer of the Menier Chocolate Factory's revival of Little Shop of Horrors, and filmed My Life in Ruins, an American comedy film set in the ruins of ancient Greece. In 2008 he made his directing debut at Guildhall School of Music and Drama (where he studied) with Noël Coward's classic comedy Semi-Monde.

In January and February 2008, McGowan starred as the eponymous protagonist of The Mikado by Gilbert and Sullivan, in a revival by the Carl Rosa Opera Company. On 21 April 2008, he took over the role of Emcee in Cabaret at London's Lyric Theatre. In July of that year, he appeared in a revival of They're Playing Our Song at the Menier Chocolate Factory.

In March 2009, McGowan starred as the Duke in the stage version of Shakespeare's Measure for Measure.

McGowan appeared as a host on one episode of the fifth series of Live at the Apollo, which aired on 1 January 2010.

McGowan appeared in Skins in February 2011,  playing Nick's coach in the fifth episode of the new series. On 12 March, he played the part of the Pirate King in Gilbert and Sullivan's The Pirates of Penzance, at the Barbican Centre, London. and, later in the year, took over from Rupert Everett in the part of Henry Higgins in Pygmalion at the Garrick Theatre, opposite Kara Tointon as Eliza Doolittle. In April 2011, he took to the stage at the Djanogly Theatre, Lakeside Arts Centre at the University of Nottingham in David Mamet's controversial drama Oleanna. Also in 2011, he co-starred in the CBBC series Leonardo as Piero di Cosimo de' Medici. On 9 June 2011 he was unveiled as the newest addition to the BBC Wimbledon commentary team.

In 2013, McGowan embarked on a fifty-date stand-up tour in his show Not Just A Pretty Voice. He also took part, with Eddie Izzard, in the first ever stand-up show performed by two English comics totally in French in Sheffield. His voice appeared in the film The Unbeatables.

From 10 June to 11 July 2015, McGowan starred as Jimmy Savile in An Audience with Jimmy Savile, a play written by Jonathan Maitland, at the Park Theatre in London. McGowan was praised for his performance. The show was transferred to the Edinburgh Festival Fringe in August. He made another cameo as Savile in the movie, Creation Stories about Creation Records owner, Alan McGee.

Music
In 2013 McGowan explained in a piece for The Guardian that he had "... hero-worshipped the French composer Erik Satie for many years. Not only was he a hugely innovative and visionary composer – but he was also a man with a passion for all forms of art."

In October 2014 McGowan narrated, in the guise of Satie, a concert of surrealist ballet music from Paris in the 1920s, given by the BBC Concert Orchestra at the Queen Elizabeth Hall in London and broadcast live by BBC Radio 3.

In September 2017 he released a debut album on Sony Classical, featuring piano performances of several short classical pieces, all chosen and learned by him. Previously McGowan could only ever play two pieces, but then practised for up to six hours a day over a nine-month period, despite already being in his early 50s.

Environmental work
McGowan serves as an ambassador to WWF-UK, part of the global World Wide Fund for Nature, and campaigns on a number of environmental issues. He is a patron of the urban tree-planting charity Trees for Cities.

In 2004 he launched 'the BIG recycle' national recycling campaign. In August 2006 he appeared on Steve Wright's BBC Radio 2 show to appeal to listeners to be more energy aware. In June 2007 he appeared on the James Whale Show on Talksport to also talk this issue.

In January 2009 it was announced that McGowan in partnership with three other Greenpeace activists, including actress Emma Thompson, had bought land near Sipson, Middlesex, a village under threat from the proposed third runway for Heathrow Airport. It is hoped that the area of ground, half the size of a football pitch, will prevent the government from carrying through its plan to expand Heathrow. The field, bought for an undisclosed sum from a local land owner, will be split into small squares and sold across the globe. When interviewed Mr McGowan said: "BAA were so confident of getting the Government's go ahead, but we have cunningly bought the land they need to build their runway."

In 2009 he attended the Bromley Environmental Awards and was the celebrity guest at Bromley Civic Centre where the awards were presented to various schools in the borough.

In June 2011 it was announced that McGowan had become a Patron of the Friends of Brandwood End Cemetery, where over 30 members of his extended family are interred.

Other work
ElvenQuest, radio 2009, as Lord Darkness.
 He has written the book A Matter of Life and Death (2009) with his former comedy partner Ronni Ancona.

Personal life
McGowan was in a relationship for seven years with fellow television comedian Ronni Ancona.  In August 2013 McGowan married his girlfriend Charlotte Page alongside whom he had performed in The Mikado.

McGowan is a supporter of Leeds United, even claiming that he decided to study at Leeds partly because of its proximity to Elland Road, and Coventry City, the team closest to the area where he spent his late teens, and his interest in football forms the basis of his 2009 book A Matter of Life and Death. On the 17 December 2012 edition of Countdown, Susie Dent revealed that McGowan neither owns a car nor drives.

Since 2020 McGowan has lived in Ludlow, Shropshire.

References

External links
 Alistair McGowan News, Biography and CV – Official Web site
 
 

1964 births
Male actors from Worcestershire
Musicians from Worcestershire
Comedians from Worcestershire
Alumni of the Guildhall School of Music and Drama
Alumni of the University of Leeds
Anglo-Indian people
BAFTA winners (people)
British people of Anglo-Indian descent
English male comedians
English environmentalists
English male film actors
English impressionists (entertainers)
English male musical theatre actors
English people of Indian descent
English people of Irish descent
English male television actors
Living people
People from Evesham
Royal Shakespeare Company members
20th-century English comedians
21st-century English comedians